FastTrack Automation Studio (formerly known as FastTrack Scripting Host), often referred to as just FastTrack, is a scripting language for Windows IT System Administrators. The product’s goal is to handle any kind of scripting that might be required to automate processes with Microsoft Windows networks. The web site of the product is located at www.fasttrackscript.com.

Manufacturer 

FastTrack is produced by FastTrack Software, which is headquartered in Aalborg, Denmark. The product is promoted by the manufacturer as a one-stop shop for Windows script writers and its development paradigm is “one operation = one script line”. Script writers use a purpose-built editor to create scripts, inserting script lines via menus, drag’n drop, or simply typing them in. Scripts may be used out of the box, created from scratch, imported from forums or other users, or customized from product documentation.

Types of scripts 

Simple scripts include:
 Outlook Signatures
 Login scripts
 Backup and replication scripts
 Inventory and asset management
 Automated Windows OS installation and deployment  
 Automated application software deployment
 Active Directory scripts
More advanced scripts include:
 SCCM task sequences
 Citrix ICA and RDP Clients built-in
 Deploying applications to server farms
 Deploying GPO MSI files
 SQL Server scripts

Basic structure 

Under the hood, scripts comprise commands, functions, collections, and conditions. When a script is executed these components are converted into many lines of C# code, sometimes hundreds of lines, depending on the particular script operation. Scripts can be compiled into EXE files or MSI packages and treated as standalone Windows applications.

History 
FastTrack Scripting Host (FastTrack) was first developed around 2006 to ease the administration burden of IT System Administrators on Windows networks.

Product idea 
The idea for the product came from founder and President of FastTrack Software, Lars Pedersen, who has a background in systems administration. Previously with Telenor, Denmark’s major telephone company, Pedersen performed various roles in systems administration, programming and web development. He also worked as a consultant and developer on several major projects at various companies in Europe.
Dissatisfied from his own experiences and frustrations administering Windows networks, Pederson looked for a way to make life easier for system administrators. In particular, he wanted something that could minimize the amount of time needed each day to perform routine and mundane tasks, which was a waste of time and expertise that should have been committed to other projects.

Development 
Leading a small team of developers, Pedersen developed FastTrack Scripting Host to simplify and automate the routine tasks of system administrators. The resulting product is definitely a scripting language, but it can be used intuitively like a programming language, without requiring users to learn syntax or other concepts typically associated with programming languages.

Marketing 
In April 2010, FastTrack Software entered into an agreement with Binary Research International, based in the city of Milwaukee, United States to market and sell the product globally.

Awards 
FSH received a Windows IT Pro Community Choice award in 2012.

Versions 
The first version was produced in June 2006 and contained 51 components, which are the commands, functions, conditions and collections making up FastTrack.
The following table summarizes dates and components for major releases. Companies and organizations such as NOAA, Kawasaki, and Goodyear have used and implemented the FastTrack Scripting Host.

Comparison with other scripting software 

FastTrack Scripting Host
Kixtart
PowerShell
ScriptLogic
VBScript

References 

Programming tools
Integrated development environments
Scripting languages